Mael Ísu Ua Cerbaill was a bishop in Ireland during the 12th century. 
He served as the Bishop of Louth from 1182 and Archbishop of Armagh from 1184, holding both preferments until his death in 1187.

References

12th-century Roman Catholic bishops in Ireland
Bishops of Louth
Archbishops of Armagh
1187 deaths